The Czech National Socialist Party, abbreviated to ČSNS 2005, was a centre-left nationalist political party in the Czech Republic. Founded in 2005 by members of the Czech National Social Party because of financial problems of that party, ČSNS 2005 was committed to the heritage of the First Republic Czechoslovak National Socialist Party, party of Edvard Beneš or Milada Horáková. The Czech National Socialist Party was a Eurosceptic party and cooperated with the alliance Sovereignty – Jana Bobošíková Bloc.

See also

Czech National Social Party

External links
 Czech National Socialist Party Official website

2005 establishments in the Czech Republic
Democratic socialist parties in Europe
Nationalist parties in the Czech Republic
Eurosceptic parties in the Czech Republic
Political parties established in 2005
Political parties disestablished in 2022
Socialist parties in the Czech Republic
Czech National Social Party